Men in Kilts: A Roadtrip with Sam and Graham is an American documentary miniseries that follows Sam Heughan and Graham McTavish as they travel across Scotland and discover their heritage. It premiered on February 14, 2021, on Starz.

A second season, exploring New Zealand and its connections to Scotland, was announced in November 2021.

Plot
Sam Heughan and Graham McTavish travel across Scotland on a road-trip in search of their complex and rich heritage.

Episodes

Production
In June 2020, it was announced Sam Heughan and Graham McTavish would star and executive produce documentary travel-series, with Sony Pictures Television and Boardwalk Pictures producing, with Starz set to distribute.

Reception

Critical reception
On Rotten Tomatoes, the series holds an approval rating of 100% based on 5 reviews, with an average rating of 8.07/10. On Metacritic, the series holds a rating of 82 out of 100, based on 4 critics, indicating universal acclaim".

References

External links
 
 
 

2021 American television series debuts
2021 American television series endings
2020s American television miniseries
2020s American documentary television series
2021 British television series debuts
2021 British television series endings
2020s British documentary television series
English-language television shows
Television series by Sony Pictures Television
Starz original programming
Television series by Boardwalk Pictures